Abdul Ganiyu Salami (born 5 October 1942) is a Nigerian and Ghanaian footballer. Salami represented Ghana at the 1965 African Cup of Nations. In 1967 he switched to Nigeria. He competed in the men's tournament at the 1968 Summer Olympics.

References

External links
 

1942 births
Living people
Ghanaian footballers
Nigerian footballers
Ghana international footballers
Nigeria international footballers
Dual internationalists (football)
1965 African Cup of Nations players
Africa Cup of Nations-winning players
Olympic footballers of Nigeria
Footballers at the 1968 Summer Olympics
People from Ogbomosho
Association football forwards